Patrick O'Hara was an Irish politician, general merchant and farmer. He stood as an National League Party candidate at the June 1927 general election but was not elected. He was elected to Dáil Éireann as a Cumann na nGaedheal Teachta Dála (TD) for the Mayo North constituency at the 1932 general election. He did not contest the 1933 general election.

References

Year of birth missing
Year of death missing
Cumann na nGaedheal TDs
Members of the 7th Dáil
Irish farmers
Politicians from County Mayo